Phaea sherylae is a species of beetle in the family Cerambycidae. It was described by Chemsak in 1999. It is known from Costa Rica.

References

sherylae
Beetles described in 1999